Wilhelm Delano Meriwether (born April 23, 1943) is an American physician and a former track and field athlete. He is best known for having been the head of the United States government immunization program during the 1976 swine flu outbreak and as the 1971 US outdoor track and field champion in the 100-yard dash.

Early life
Meriwether was born in Nashville, Tennessee, United States to parents who were teachers. His father, Wilhelm R. Meriwether, in time became a principal of Burke High School in Charleston, South Carolina where the younger Meriwether was educated. At Burke he played saxophone on the school band and was a member of the Science Club. His sporting involvement at high school was limited as he was considered too small for basketball and football.  Meriwether graduated from Burke in 1960.

While still at high school Meriwether worked in a veterinary hospital having already won an award from the American Veterinary Medical Association as a 16-year-old for research on internal parasites found in dogs. After graduating from high school he received a scholarship to study at Michigan State University; taking pre-veterinary studies for two years before switching to pre-medical. After three years he graduated from Michigan State and became the first African American to be accepted into Duke University School of Medicine, graduating with honors in 1967 and then obtained a Master of Public Health from Johns Hopkins University.

Medicine
After graduating from Duke, Meriwether took his internship at the Penn State Milton S. Hershey Medical Center, before starting a residency at Ohio State University Medical Center. He later specialized in hematology, the study of blood, and had a number of papers published. In the early 1970s he worked researching Leukemia at the Baltimore Cancer Research Center, and was a 1973-1974 White House Fellow.

In 1976 Meriwether, as Special Assistant to the Assistant Secretary of Health, was appointed Director of the United States Public Health Service's National Influenza Immunization Program (NIIP). The NIIP sought to immunize over 200 million people against swine influenza within six months. This program faced much opposition as many doctors, pharmaceutical companies and insurance companies refused to take responsibility for mishaps. Meriwether became the public face of this campaign.

In 1983 he moved to Gazankulu in South Africa where he worked as a missionary doctor and was one of six physicians treating a half million people. He later worked and lived in the Soweto township.

Meriwether returned to the United States in 1990 working as an Emergency Room doctor.

Athletics

Meriwether began competitive running in 1970 while working at the Baltimore Cancer Research Center. In order to train Meriwether would scale a fence at the nearby Johns Hopkins University athletics track and would run at night in the dark.  Due to his relative inexperience and unique attire, Meriwether drew the attention of the news media; appearing on the cover of Sports Illustrated posing in his running gear, and also featured in Time.

Meriwether made his mark as a runner at the Amateur Athletic Union USA Outdoor Track and Field Championships in Eugene, Oregon in June 1971 when he won the 100-yard dash. His appearance at the event was unusual for a number of reasons. He was unattached to any educational institution and he was wearing a hospital shirt, gold and white suspenders and swimming trunks. The most remarkable element of the day was the time he recorded for the 100-yard dash. In recording a nine-second 100-yard he became the second runner to run the distance in nine seconds flat, the other being John Carlos, however Meriwether's time did not count as a record as the run was wind assisted.

In 1972 Meriwether was the United States Indoor Track and Field Champion, but due to a knee injury he was unable to compete for selection for the United States 1972 Olympic Games team. After another injury prevented his chances of being selected for the 1976 Olympics, he retired from regular competition to concentrate on medicine.

For a number of years he ran in masters events and his 200-meter run of 20.8 seconds in 1978 is still a current national record in the 35-39 age group.

Personal life
Delano is married to Nomvimbi Meriwether, who runs a travel agency specializing in tours of Africa. Their daughter, Nana Meriwether (b. 1985) represented Maryland in the 2012 Miss USA Pageant and was named the New Miss USA 2012 on December 19, after current Miss USA Olivia Culpo became Miss Universe 2012.

Popular culture
The novel Bethany Park, by Glen Sharp, tells the story of a boy inspired to run after reading of Dr Meriwether's athletic endeavors in Sports Illustrated.

References

External links

 Sports Illustrated cover featuring Delano Meriwether

1943 births
Living people
American male sprinters
African-American male track and field athletes
Duke University School of Medicine alumni
Ford administration personnel
American hematologists
Johns Hopkins Bloomberg School of Public Health alumni
Johns Hopkins University faculty
Michigan State University alumni
Ohio State University faculty
Pennsylvania State University faculty
Sportspeople from Charleston, South Carolina
Sportspeople from Nashville, Tennessee
Track and field athletes from South Carolina
Track and field athletes from Tennessee
University of Maryland, Baltimore faculty
Athletes (track and field) at the 1971 Pan American Games
American masters athletes
White House Fellows
Pan American Games bronze medalists for the United States
Pan American Games medalists in athletics (track and field)
USA Outdoor Track and Field Championships winners
USA Indoor Track and Field Championships winners
Medalists at the 1971 Pan American Games